Pete Werner (born June 5, 1999) is an American football linebacker for the New Orleans Saints of the National Football League (NFL). He played college football at Ohio State and was drafted by the Saints in the second round of the 2021 NFL Draft.

Early life and high school
Werner grew up in Indianapolis, Indiana, and attended Cathedral High School. Werner initially committed to play college football at Notre Dame at the end of his junior year over offers from Duke, Iowa, Michigan, Michigan State, Northwestern, Ohio State, Penn State, Tennessee, Texas A&M, Vanderbilt and Wisconsin. As a senior, he recorded 64 tackles, with 17 tackles for loss and eight sacks and was named Class 6A All-State. Werner de-committed from Notre Dame during the season and re-opened his recruitment before opting to attend Ohio State.

College career
Werner recorded nine tackles as a true freshman. He had 58 tackles including 7.5 tackles for loss and two forced fumbles in his sophomore season. As a junior, Werner recorded 64 tackles, 5.5 tackles for loss, two fumbles recovered and three passes broken up and was named honorable mention All-Big Ten Conference.

Professional career

Werner was selected by the New Orleans Saints in the second round (60th overall) of the 2021 NFL Draft. He signed his four-year rookie contract with New Orleans on June 8, 2021.

Personal life
Werner's father, Greg Werner, played college football at DePauw University and in the NFL for two seasons with the New York Jets and Philadelphia Eagles. His older brother Dan played college football at Harvard.

References

External links
Ohio State Buckeyes bio

1999 births
Living people
American football linebackers
New Orleans Saints players
Ohio State Buckeyes football players
Players of American football from Indianapolis